Black Gull is a 1962 Soviet adventure film directed by Grigoriy Koltunov.

Plot 
The film takes place in Cuba after the revolution, in a fishing village by the sea. The United States is still trying to return the old regime and send sabotage groups there. The film tells about a group of guys in whose eyes this is happening.

Cast 
 Anatoliy Adoskin
 Saida Dadasheva as Panchita
 Igor Dmitriev
 Dzheikhun Dzhamal as Manolo
 Aleksei Loktev
 Anatoliy Podshivalov as Sardinka
 Viktoriya Vika as Silviya
 Sergei Yursky

References

External links 
 

1962 films
1960s Russian-language films
Soviet adventure films
1962 adventure films